Octadecaborane is an inorganic compound, a borane with chemical formula B18H22. It is a colorless flammable solid, like many higher boron hydrides. Although the compound has no practical applications, its structure is of theoretical and pedagogical interest.

Synthesis
It is formed by oxidative degradation of B20H182− or by oxidative coupling of B9H12−.

Structure 
Two isomers are known of octadecaborane, providing the first example of isomers in a boron-hydride cluster.  The clusters are also of interest because the boron centers shared between the two subunits have an unusually high number of B-B interactions.  The isomers consists of two B9H11 polyhedral subunits, each having a decaborane-like form, joined at a B–B edge. These two boron atoms are each coordinated to six others; this compound was the first one found to have such a high number of borons coordinated around a single boron center. There are two different geometric isomers of this compound, differing in the orientation of the two edge-fused polyhedra to each other. This compound was the first borane found to have multiple isomeric forms. Among the geometric isomers, one with chirality was the first borane to be resolved into its separate enantiomers, and was only the second chiral borane known at that time.

References

Boranes